Ignition is a racing game for DOS and Microsoft Windows released in 1996 by Virgin Interactive. It features miniature cars, much like Death Rally and different vehicles such as school buses, police cars and trucks - many of which are unlocked as the game progresses. It was re-released by Interplay in 2017.

Development

Ignition's soundtrack and sound effects were produced by Christian Björklund.

Reception
Ignition received generally favourable reviews. Many highlighted the game's entertainment value, a very good first impression and detailed graphics. Some mentioned its similarity to Micro Machines 2 also featuring "small cars", and the game's simplicity was both seen positively and negatively (lacking content) in comparison.

See also
 Micro Machines (video game series)

References

External links

1996 video games
DOS games
Racing video games
Top-down racing video games
Unique Development Studios games
Multiplayer and single-player video games
Virgin Interactive games
Windows games
Video games developed in Sweden